The 1977  World Sports Car Championship season was the 25th season of FIA World Sportscar Championship motor racing. It featured two separate World Championship series.
 The 1977 World Championship for Sports Cars, which was contested by Group 6 Two-Seater Racing Cars 
 The 1977 World Championship for Makes, which was open to cars from various production-based categories including Group 5 Special Production Cars

In 1978 the World Championship of Makes would become the sole international series, while the World Championship for Sports Cars would be downgraded by the FIA to become the European Sportscar Championship. The European Championship was discontinued at the end of the 1978 season.

World Championship for Sports Cars 
The 1977 World Championship for Sports Cars, which was restricted to Group 6 Two-Seater Racing Cars, was contested over an eight race series which ran from 17 April to 18 September 1977. The championship was won by Alfa Romeo.

Schedule

Race results

Points system
Points towards the 1977 World Championship for Sports Cars were awarded to each relevant car manufacturer for the first ten places in each race in the order of 20-15-12-10-8-6-4-3-2-1.  
Points were only awarded for the best placed car from each manufacturer at each race with no points given for places gained by other cars from the same manufacturer.
Only the best six results counted towards each manufacturer’s championship total, with any other points earned not included.
Discarded points are shown within brackets in the table below.

Championship results
Results of the 1977 World Championship for Sports Cars were as follows.

The cars
The following models contributed to the nett point scores of their respective manufacturers in the 1977 World Championship for Sports Cars.

 Alfa Romeo 33SC12
 Osella PA5 BMW & PA5 Ford
 Lola T294 Ford & T296 Ford
 Chevron B36 ROC Chrysler-Simca, B23 Ford, B31 Ford, B36 Ford, B31 Chrysler-Simca & B36 BMW
 Sauber C5 BMW
 TOJ SC302 Ford
 AMS 277 Fiat & 277 Ford
 McLaren M8F Chevrolet
 March 76S BMW

World Championship of Makes

The 1977 World Championship for Makes was open to cars from various production-based categories including Group 5 Special Production Cars. The championship was won by Porsche.

References

External links
 1977 World Sportscar Championship results

World Sportscar Championship seasons
World Sportscar Championship